The Great Houdinis  The Great Houdini is a 1976 American made-for-television biographical film which is a fictionalized account of the life of the Hungarian-American escape artist and entertainer Harry Houdini. The film was written and directed by Melville Shavelson and features Paul Michael Glaser (Starsky & Hutch) and Sally Struthers (All in the Family) and originally aired on ABC on October 8, 1976.

Overview
The movie features the early career of Houdini, the relationship between his wife and mother, and his and his wife's attempts to reach "the other side", with him attempting to contact his deceased mother and her attempting to contact Houdini himself after his death.  Although the film portrays a strained relationship between Houdini's wife and mother, in reality they got along relatively well.

Some notable performances were turned in by Vivian Vance as Bess Houdini's nurse (and the narrator), Ruth Gordon as Houdini's mother, Peter Cushing as Sir Arthur Conan Doyle, and Bill Bixby as Rev. Arthur Ford.

When the film was rebroadcast on April 6, 1977, the title was changed to The Great Houdini.

Cast
Paul Michael Glaser as Harry Houdini (Erich Weiss)
Sally Struthers as Bess Houdini
Ruth Gordon as Cecilia Weiss
Vivian Vance as Minnie (Nurse)
Adrienne Barbeau as Daisy White
Bill Bixby as Rev. Arthur Ford
Jack Carter as Theo Weiss
Peter Cushing as Sir Arthur Conan Doyle
Nina Foch as Rev. Le Veyne
Wilfrid Hyde-White as Supt. Melville
Geoffrey Lewis as Dr. Crandon
Maureen O'Sullivan as Lady Conan Doyle
Clive Revill as Dundas Slater

References

External links

 
 Making of The Great Houdinis at Wild About Harry

1976 television films
1976 films
1970s biographical films
ABC network original films
American television films
American biographical films
Biographical television films
Films about magic and magicians
Films directed by Melville Shavelson
Cultural depictions of Harry Houdini
Cultural depictions of Arthur Conan Doyle
Films set in the 1890s
Films set in the 1900s
Films set in the 1910s
Films set in the 1920s
1970s American films